The Crenuchidae, South American darters, are a family of freshwater fish of the order Characiformes. The 12 genera include about 74 species, though several species are undescribed. These fish are relatively small (usually under  in  standard length) and originate from eastern Panama and South America. Both subfamilies were previously included in the family Characidae, and were placed in a separate family by Buckup, 1998. Buckup, 1993, revised all genera, except Characidium.

See also
List of fish families

References

 
Ray-finned fish families